The New American High Schools initiative, started in 1996 under the direction of the United States Secretary of Education Richard W. Riley, is a national recognition program for United States secondary schools.

Description
In 1996, 1998, 1999, and 2000, a varying number of high schools were selected and honored with the title of "New American High School showcase site" at the White House; they are intended to serve as models for schools that have achieved high levels of success. In addition to receiving national recognition, each winning school receives a stipend and technical assistance from the United States Department of Education.

No new awards have been given since 2000.

List of showcase sites
The following is an exhaustive list of sites that have been awarded the New American High School designation:

1996 (10 sites)
Chicago High School for Agricultural Sciences, Chicago, Illinois
David Douglas High School, Portland, Oregon
Encina High School, Sacramento, California
Fenway Middle College High School, Boston, Massachusetts
St. Louis Career Academy, St. Louis, Missouri
High School of Economics and Finance, New York, New York
Sussex Technical High School, Georgetown, Delaware
Thompson School District, Loveland, Colorado
Walhalla High School, Walhalla, South Carolina
William H. Turner Technical Arts High School, Miami, Florida

1998 (7 sites)
Adlai E. Stevenson High School, Lincolnshire, Illinois
Coronado High School, Coronado, California
DeBakey High School for Health Professions, Houston, Texas
Greene JROTC Academy, Dayton, Ohio
Marine Academy of Science and Technology, Sandy Hook, New Jersey
Newman Smith High School, Carrollton, Texas
Saunders Trades and Technical High School, Yonkers, New York

1999 (13 sites)
Angola High School, Angola, Indiana
Brooklyn Technical High School, Brooklyn, New York
East Grand Rapids High School, Grand Rapids, Michigan
Eastern Technical High School, Baltimore, Maryland
Eleanor Roosevelt High School, Greenbelt, Maryland
Fox Chapel Area High School, Pittsburgh, Pennsylvania
MAST Academy, Miami, Florida
Niceville High School, Niceville, Florida
Northeast Magnet High School, Wichita, Kansas
Rex Putnam High School, Milwaukie, Oregon
Sir Francis Drake High School, San Anselmo, California
South Grand Prairie High School, Grand Prairie, Texas
The School of Environmental Studies at the Minnesota Zoo, Apple Valley, Minnesota

2000 (27 sites)
Academy for the Arts, Science and Technology, Myrtle Beach, SC
Aliso Niguel High School, Aliso Viejo, CA
Beverly Hills High School, Beverly Hills, CA
Chugach School District, Anchorage, Alaska
Fort Mill High School, Fort Mill, SC
Fred J. Page High School, Franklin, TN
Fredericksburg High School, Fredericksburg, TX
Grapevine High School, Grapevine, TX
Irvington High School, Fremont, California
John Dewey High School, Brooklyn, NY
Judson High School, Converse, TX
Laguna Creek High School, Elk Grove, CA
Lake Orion High School, Lake Orion, MI
Las Vegas Academy of International Studies, Visual and Performing Arts, Las Vegas, NV
Leland High School, San Jose, CA
Los Fresnos High School, Los Fresnos, TX
Menchville High School, Newport News, VA
New Technology High School, Napa, California
Paint Branch High School, Burtonsville, MD
Palatine High School, Palatine, IL
Palos Verdes Peninsula High School, Rolling Hills Estates, CA
Reynolds High School, Troutdale, OR
Swain County High School, Bryson City, NC
Torrey Pines High School, San Diego, CA
Troy High School, Fullerton, CA
Upper St. Clair High School, Upper St. Clair, PA
Urban Academy Laboratory High School, New York, NY

References

External links
United States Department of Education: Official Description of Initiative
List of New American High Schools Showcase Sites (web.archive.org)

Education policy in the United States
United States Department of Education
Secondary education in the United States
Public education in the United States